Conception Bay East–Bell Island is a provincial electoral district for the House of Assembly of Newfoundland and Labrador, Canada. As of 2011 there are 11,011 eligible voters living within the district.

Primarily a suburban district within the St. John's Metropolitan Area, the district includes Bell Island (which is linked by a ferry service to the rest of the district), the town of Portugal Cove–St. Philip's, part of the town of Paradise, and the watershed area along Thorburn Road.

Members of the House of Assembly
The district has elected the following Members of the House of Assembly:

Former district of Bell Island

Election results

}

 
|NDP
|George Murphy
|align="right"|1,043
|align="right"|26.20%
|align="right"|+15.96%

|}

|-

|-

|-
 
|NDP
|Gavin Will
|align="right"|569
|align="right"|10.24%
|align="right"|
|}

|-

|-

|-
 
|NDP
|Ken Kavanagh
|align="right"|1,180
|align="right"|16.02%
|align="right"|+0.58%
|-

|Independent
|Doug Cole
|align="right"|171
|align="right"|2.32%
|align="right"|+2.32%
|}

|-

|-

|-
 
|NDP
|Ken Kavanagh
|align="right"|932
|align="right"|15.44%
|align="right"|+10.18

|}

|-

|-

|-

|Independent
|Ken Kavanagh
|align="right"|566 
|align="right"|9.42%
|align="right"|
|-
 
|NDP
|David Sullivan
|align="right"|316
|align="right"|5.26%
|align="right"|
|}

References

External links 
Website of the Newfoundland and Labrador House of Assembly

Newfoundland and Labrador provincial electoral districts